The following are international rankings of Slovenia.

References

Slovenia